

G'nort

Galactic Golem

The Galactic Golem is a creature created by Lex Luthor in the DC Universe. Within the context of the stories, the Golem is a solar-powered enemy of Superman. Creator Len Wein said that he created the Golem "because I needed somebody Superman could hit! The problem with Superman's rogues' gallery was, they were all thinkers...they were scientists, or guys who built toys. With the Golem, he could hit Superman, and Superman could hit him back".

It only made two appearances: Superman #248 (February 1972) and 258 (November 1972). Afterwards, it was erased from continuity following Crisis on Infinite Earths.

Paul Gambi
Paul Gambi is a tailor in Central City who associates himself with the Rogues as seen in his first appearance where Flash pursues Top to his place of work. Following Top's defeat, Paul was arrested for being an accessory to Top. Paul Gambi later gives Flash a new suit. While testing it out, Flash sees that the loot of the villains that he fights goes missing.

An amnesiac Gorilla Grodd in human form stumbles into Paul Gambi's shop. To help with Gorilla Grodd's amnesia, Paul Gambi starts to tell him the origins of the Rogues. Upon Flash's name triggering his memory, Gorilla Grodd persuades Paul to make him a Grodd suit. When the Rogues arrive and attack Grodd, he suddenly transforms back into a gorilla. After Gorilla Grodd is defeated, Solovar thanks Paul for stalling before taking Gorilla Grodd back to Gorilla City.

Paul Gambi later created the "ultimate super-costume" which was first worn by serial killer Dell Merriwether until he was defeated by Flash and Green Lantern and got sentenced to the electric chair. What Paul didn't count on is that the Suit gained a mind of its own and could not be destroyed.

In the "DC Rebirth" reboot, Flash invades the business of Paul Gambi to get information on where the Rogues are. He was unable to get an answer out of Paul.

Paul Gambi in other media
 Paul Gambi is alluded to in the pilot episode of The Flash. When Barry Allen first discovers his speed, he accidentally runs into a van saying "Gambi's Dry Cleaning". In the episode "Godspeed", Nora West Allen in her origin story crashes into the back of a van marked "Gambi & Sons", shortly after getting her powers similar to her father.
 Paul Gambi appears in issue #15 of the Batman: The Brave and the Bold comic series.

Peter Gambi

Gambler

Ganthet

Allegra Garcia

Allegra Garcia is a character appearing in American comic books published by DC Comics. She is the daughter of supervillain Eduardo Reyes / Wavelength, and inherited his light manipulation powers.

Allegra Garcia was raised in the Santa Marta slums of Rio de Janeiro, Brazil by her foster parents Ramon and Esperanza Garcia. Upon emigrating to Gotham City while developing the ability to emit electromagnetic light, she fell in with some gangs and took parts in robberies before being stopped by the local vigilantes and remanded to Arkham Asylum. To reunite with his daughter after some villains he knew saw Allegra, Wavelength hired Deathstroke and his version of the Titans to spring her out of Arkham Asylum. Though they had to get through Batman and some of Arkham Asylum's inmates like Clayface, Killer Croc, Mad Hatter, Victor Zsasz who sought to take the advantage to escape from Arkham Asylum. When the mission was a success, Deathstroke's Titans brought her to Brazil where Allegra lashed out against her father for abandoning her and used the UV rays in the sky to fry him. Deathstroke declined Allegra's offer to join up with him stating that she has a lot of growing up to do.

Allegra Garcia in other media
Allegra Garcia appears on The CW Arrowverse TV series The Flash, portrayed by Kayla Compton. She was originally a recurring character in season six before being promoted to the main cast from season seven onwards. This version is a young metahuman with abilities based on the electromagnetic spectrum who wants to become a reporter ever since she saw Iris West's article on the Streak. Despite coming from a criminal background and having been previously incarcerated in Iron Heights Penitentiary, Cecile Horton is able to help Allegra turn her life around. After an attack by her metahuman cousin Ultraviolet and being framed for her crimes, Allegra is saved by the Flash. Following this, she gets a job interning at the Central City Citizen newspaper. Allegra would later go on to investigate the Black Hole, which turned Ultraviolet into a killer, help Team Flash stop supervillains such as Bloodwork and Godspeed, and reform Ultraviolet.

Esperanza Garcia
Esperanza Garcia is a character appearing in American comic books published by DC Comics. She is the adoptive mother of Allegra Garcia.

Esperanza Garcia in other media
A variation of Esperanza Garcia appears as a recurring character on The CW series The Flash, portrayed by Alexa Barajas and voiced by Erika Soto in season seven. This version is Allegra Garcia's cousin and possesses similar electromagnetic spectrum-based abilities. Additionally, she was believed to have been killed during the explosion of S.T.A.R. Labs' particle accelerator, but was secretly taken in, revived, and trained to become the assassin Ultraviolet by Black Hole. Amidst this, her vocal cords were removed by Black Hole scientist Dr. Olsen and Esperanza was outfitted with a mask to help her speak. After making minor appearances in season six, Esperanza seeks revenge on Dr. Olsen in season seven, but is foiled by Allegra and receives medical help from Dr. Caitlin Snow to heal from her experience with Black Hole. However, Esperanza is killed while hunting and destroying Black Hole's remnants and disintegrates in Allegra's arms.

Garguax
Garguax is a fictional character appearing in American comic books published by DC Comics. He is a mammoth-sized alien conqueror who was exiled from his home planet for his plans to conquer the universe. He came to Earth and invaded it with an army of Plastic Men. Mento found his ship and encountered him as he learned his backstory. When Mento didn't want to help Garguax with his goals, Garguax used his technology to brainwash him. After the Doom Patrol freed Mento from his mind-control, they fought Garguax. The Doom Patrol destroyed the ship which seemingly killed Garguax.

Garguax later appeared as a member of the Brotherhood of Evil alongside General Immortus at the time when they unleashed a Giant Jukebox Robot. Garguax pitches an idea to the Brotherhood of Evil to take over Earth. General Immortus supported his idea as he uses a device to turn anyone into diamond-skinned slaves that obey the Brotherhood of Evil's every command.

Garguax was with the Brotherhood of Evil at the time when Madame Rouge planned to discredit Mento before his wedding to Elasti-Girl. Chief figures out the Rouge and the Doom Patrol caused the Brotherhood of Evil to retreat.

Following the Doom Patrol's apparent death, Garguax creates a giant android called Mandred to attack Chief and Beast Boy. When the Doom Patrol turns up alive as Brain tries to attack Chief, the Brotherhood of Evil get away as Brain remotely broadcasts some solar energy to revive Mandred.

The claims that Garguax made about being exiled from his homeworld were false as he turned out to be an agent of his homeworld's ruler Zarox-13. Garguax betrayed the Brotherhood of Evil after Zarox-13 arrived on Earth to conquer it. The Doom Patrol and the Brotherhood of Evil had to work together to defeat Zarox-13.

During the Invasion! storyline, Garguax attempted to join the alien alliance only to be rejected. This caused Garguax to join forces with the Doom Patrol to defend Earth from the upcoming alien invasion while secretly planning to take over Earth himself. Following the end of the alien invasion, Garguax resumed his plans to try to destroy the Doom Patrol. Chief called in a favor from the President of the United States to fire a laser satellite at Garguax's ship enough to obliterate him.

Garguax was sighted in Eclipso's vision among the characters that were eclipsed by him.

Garguax in other media 
Garguax the Decimator appeared in the Doom Patrol episode "Vacay Patrol", portrayed by Stephen Murphy. He is seen as a member of the Brotherhood of Evil and is served by a red alien named Samuelson (portrayed by Billy Boyd). In 1949, the Brotherhood of Evil assigned Garguax to assassinate Rita Farr. They had to wait decades for the signal to perform the assignment to go off. Garguax and Samuelson find out that the Brotherhood of Evil has disbanded. While at the resort, Garguax overhears the Doom Patrol and learns of Caulder's fate and Rita's state of mind. Realizing his mission no longer has purpose, he intends to leave the resort, much to Samuelson's dismay. As they prepare to leave, they finally receive a signal from the Brotherhood, prompting Samuelson to turn on Garguax and kill him before killing the Doom Patrol.

Garn Daanuth 

Garn Daanuth is a fictional supervillain introduced in Warlord #62 (July 1982). His character is the major antagonist in both Arion, Lord of Atlantis and Arion the Immortal titles, serving as Arion's arch-enemy. He is affiliated with the Lords of Chaos, originally stated to be one of their agents. Later and modern revisions of the character instead mention him as a genuine Lord of Chaos. In the DC Universe, he serves as a prominent evil figure in ancient Atlantis's history and the former ruler of Mu, whose people culturally resemble ancient Egyptians. He is also alleged to be an ancestor of the Titans hero, Tempest (formerly Aqualad) and a distant relative to significant DC characters such as Aquaman, Ocean Master, and Zatanna through his brother's bloodline.

Fictional history 
The eldest twin of Arion and son of Majistra and Calculha, he was instead raised by Majistra within the city-state of Mu. Taught black magic by his mother, Majistra raised him in accordance of a prophecy regarding two brothers in eternal conflict over the fate of Atlantis as an agent of the Lords of Chaos. Garn would gain a rivalry with Arion when his sacrifice of usurping the Zodiac Crystals from Majistra seemingly caused her death and bleached his skin, a reminder of his path as a dark sorcerer compared to Arion's light path and practice of white magic. Gaining a strong hatred for him, Garn would not learn of their true familial connection until centuries later and took over his mother's position as the leading figure of Mu, consolidating his wealth and sorcerous powers. Other stories mention that he was also an ally of Vandal Savage, helping Garn in his goal to undermine the ancient Atlantean government as a member of the Brotherhood of Light, the precursor to Savage's Illuminati secret society.

In the Arion, Lord of Atlantis title, Garn would be responsible for various atrocities in ancient Atlantean history, including invasions of other city-states, destroying the physical body of Calculha, his mind-control plot to usurp Arion's position as Lord High Mage driving a mentally damage D'Tilluh to commit suicide and a traumatized Wyynde becoming unresponsive, and the eradication of the Wyynde's tribe, the people of Khe-Wannantu. He was characterized often as a feared figure considered a genuine god. He also made a limited appearance in Warlord, revealed to be the ancestor of Aoife, whom was bestowed a major source of his power, Garn's circlet. Despite her evil legacy, she sided with Travis Morgan and used the powers bestowed from it for benevolent reasons. Although the image of Garn in his circlet (containing his will and personality) disapproved, he nevertheless stated his descendants are able to do whatever they pleased with their inherited power. In the Arion the Immortal series, it is detailed that after the destruction of Atlantis, Garn would relocate eventually into the Middle East and with his immortality but lack of powers, pose as a dictator of a small Middle Eastern army. When his magical abilities returned, he used them to bolster his forces until he was stopped by Arion.

A magical manifestation of his power would appear in the Young Justice comic title as a genie-like being known as Bedlam, possessing Matthew Stuart and making him a very powerful foe possessing all of Garn's magical power. He is eventually defeated by both the Young Justice team and later by Impulse using time travel to deprive him of his magical powers. For a time, the speedster also gained his powers until the intervention of Phantom Stranger sealed the evil magical forced out of Bart.

Garn Daanuth in other media 
Garn Daanuth is mentioned in various media; the character is mentioned in DC Universe Online during the "Atlantis" episode, in the "Lost Crystals of Power" briefings. Like his comic counterpart, the briefing reveals him to be a relative to the royal family in Atlantis embodied in a conflict between his brother, Arion, for the Zodiac Crystals. While not making a physical appearance, he is confirmed to have existed in the Young Justice animated series, as the ancestor of Ocean Master's lieutenant and Atlantean purist, Danuuth.

Gearhead

Gehenna

Gehenna is a superhero in the DC Universe. She is a clone of Victor Hewitt who is rescued by Firestorm. Her telepathic ability is shown to be limited to those participating in the Firestorm matrix and strongest with Jason Rusch. She becomes a romantic interest for Rusch throughout Firestorm: The Nuclear Man (vol. 2) and a participant in the matrix. She is killed by the Black Lantern Firestorm in Blackest Night #3 (September 2009).

General Immortus

General Zahl

General Zod

Gentleman Ghost

Geo-Force

Geomancer

The Geomancer is the name of two supervillains in DC Comics.

Adam Fells
Adam Fells started out as a hired gun. He attacked an African village where he caused an earthquake at the behest of the council. He got into a fight with Sand and is defeated by him.

The Geomancer later appears as a member of the Injustice Society where they attacked the Justice Society of America's headquarters. Despite being outnumbered, Wildcat manages to defeat them as Johnny Sorrow escapes after getting what he came for.

As Sand and Wildcat talk during a movie theater, two people behind them tells them to keep it down. They discover that the people are the Geomancer and Killer Wasp. The Geomancer and Killer Wasp are soon assisted in the ambush by Black Adam. Sand fights the Geomancer under the streets of New York City and defeats him.

Ultra-Humanite is revealed to have the Geomancer in suspended animation. Icicle II tried to free the Geomancer from his suspended animation, only to accidentally kill him.

Geomancer II
An unnamed man with similar powers became the second Geomancer. He is seen as a member of the Injustice Society.

Geomancer in other media
The Adam Fells incarnation of Geomancer appears in The Flash episodes "Welcome to Earth-2" and "Escape from Earth-2", portrayed by Adam Stafford.

Ghost-Maker

Minhkhoa "Khoa" Khan, also known as Ghost-Maker, is a Singaporean vigilante who was trained alongside Batman by various mentors. Despite being close friends, the two vigilantes didn't agree with each others' method of punishing crimes. After the Joker War, Ghost-Maker becomes the leader of Batman Incorporated and Clownhunter's mentor.

Giganta

Gizmo

Glorious Godfrey

Gnarrk

Goldface
Goldface is an enemy of Green Lantern and the Flash. Goldface was created by Gardner Fox and Gil Kane, first appearing in Green Lantern (vol. 2) #38 (1965).

Keith Kenyon was a political sciences student who was exposed to a chest of gold that had been affected by toxic waste. As a result of exposure, he gained superhuman strength and invulnerability. The gold also gave him a golden glow, apparently as a side effect of the serum. Of course, being close enough to yellow meant that Green Lantern's power ring could not affect him directly, making him particularly formidable against the super-hero. Deciding to rebel against the wishes of his father, a prominent labor union organizer, he began stealing gold around Coast City, which led to his defeat by Green Lantern. He began to refine his criminal ways by wearing gold-plated armor and using a "gold-gun" which sprayed liquid gold. After many clashes with Green Lantern, Kenyon decided to change his motif and ruthlessly began taking over criminal empires.

He eventually moved to Central City and became a foe of the second Flash, Barry Allen. In recent years, he apparently let go of his villainous ways marrying Amunet Black/Blacksmith. After serving his time, he moved to Keystone City and, following in his father's footsteps, became an honest Commissioner of Union 242. Over time, his elixir has slowly turned his skin into organic golden flesh.

Goldface in other media
 Goldface makes minor appearances in Justice League Unlimited, voiced by an uncredited Lex Lang. This version is a member of Gorilla Grodd's Secret Society with the ability to turn anything to gold.
 Goldface appears in The Flash, portrayed by Damion Poitier. This version is a metahuman crime boss in the black market weapons business and ex-boyfriend of Amunet Black who can turn his skin to gold and manipulate golden items.

Golden Eagle
Golden Eagle is the name of two fictional characters published by DC Comics.

Charley Parker

Pre-Crisis
The original Golden Eagle was an orphan by the name of Charley Parker. Charley lived in the Midway City orphanage and idolized Hawkman. At one point he sent a letter to Hawkman describing his home-made "Hawkman" costume. In Justice League of America #109, Hawkman had been ordered back to Thanagar, thus resigning from the JLA. Golden Eagle debuted seven issues later in Justice League of America #116.

Parker himself explained that one day he had been wearing his "Hawkman" costume and fantasizing he was him when a strange light enveloped him turning his costume into an exact replica of Hawkman's costume. He also gained the ability to fly due to the replicated wings of his costume. Charley could at will change his street clothes into the Golden Eagle costume. The Justice League was called by the Midway City Police due to several incidents where criminals were dropped off at the police headquarters, captured by someone unknown who left a gold-colored feather behind—Hawkman's old modus operandi. The Leaguers investigated and ran into the Golden Eagle when they were attacked by Hawkman's old foe Matter Master, a man who carried a mentally controlled wand that could manipulate matter—for example, changing the heads of members of the Justice League into the heads of animals. The Matter Master thought that the Golden Eagle was Hawkman and mentally had the wand bring the Golden Eagle to his hidden lair. Mandrill figured out that his wand must have transformed Charley, acting out some sort of subconscious need for the villain to battle Hawkman, who had not been seen for months. At the end of the story, Charley was changed back into a normal teenager.

Charley was seen again in Justice League of America #117, as Green Arrow took him aboard the JLA satellite as a new "mascot" (similar to Snapper Carr).

He later appeared in Teen Titans #50–52 as a member of Titans West.

Post-Crisis
In 1989, Golden Eagle was retconned as a Californian surfer, unable to hold down a job. The previous connection to Hawkman was gone. Instead, his past was a mystery, just as the origins of his costume and his powers. Nonetheless, he remained connected to the Titans West, and was involved in the Titans Hunt storyline, where he was seemingly killed by a member of the Wildebeest Society.

Ch'al Andar
In Hawkman (vol. 4) #43, a new origin for Golden Eagle was introduced. Once an orphan in Midway City's Sisters of Mercy orphanage, Charley Parker bounced around from different foster homes and orphanages for the better part of his youth, learning life's hardships along the way. At sixteen, he became a drug courier for Mick Valdare, and was adopted by various foster families. Valdare paid these families handsomely, which allowed Parker, and by extension Valdare, to keep a low profile and to have a front if caught. Parker lived a rich and spoiled life full of fast cars, expensive clothes and beautiful women until he turned eighteen. Valdare fired him because he was no longer a minor. Parker, desolate, alone and without the luxuries he had grown accustomed to, considered suicide. Hawkman saved him and became a mentor for the young man. On the hero's recommendation, Parker went to, and found a job opportunity with, Carter Hall, a museum curator and Hawkman's secret identity. Parker accepted, and was soon exposed to other heroes, including Adam Strange and Hawkgirl.

Parker earned Hall's trust when he defended Hawkgirl from the Shadow Thief. Hall revealed his secret identity, gave Parker a Thanagarian battle suit that had been discovered by Adam Strange, and began training him to be a hero. Parker, now known as Golden Eagle, finally felt he had a purpose in life. Carter Hall had to leave Earth and left Charley to his own devices. Parker eventually hooked up with the Titans West, but after that team disbanded, he returned to a slacker lifestyle, surfing and performing the occasional odd job to earn money. After discovering that renting out his services as a hero didn't generate sufficient income, he retired the Golden Eagle identity. Deathstroke asked him to track down some missing Teen Titans members at the beginning of the Titans Hunt storyline. During this time, while fighting alongside Aqualad against the [Wildebeest Society, Parker was choked to death. A statue of Golden Eagle is in the memorial section of Titans Tower. Suddenly, he was miraculously revived by the Nth-Metal within his Thanagarian armor, claiming to have rediscovered his motivation to be a force for good.

This story proved to be a ruse, and Parker's true colors and motivations appeared in Hawkman (vol. 4) #44–45. When Carter Hall was seemingly killed in battle, Parker claimed the right to his legacy, becoming the new Hawkman. He managed to win the friendship of Kendra, and claimed to be the "true" Hawkman's son (he considered Hall a "false Hawkman"). He showed Kendra a Thanagarian ship he had built using blueprints stored in his Golden Eagle armor, and asked her to follow him to Thanagar. When she refused both his proposal and sexual advances, Parker beat her and exposed the truth about his relationship with Hawkman. On the verge of killing Kendra and replacing her with a Thanagarian maiden, "more suited to his tastes", Parker was confronted by a very much alive Carter Hall, who miraculously returned for a final showdown with his former protégé.

In the subsequent fight between the two Hawkmen, it was revealed that Parker was indeed the son of a Hawkman, the villainous Fel Andar, the spy sent from Thanagar in the wake of the Invasion, the military alliance against Earth, and Earth woman Sharon Parker. Parker had carefully planned the death of Carter Hall, creating an alliance among many of Hawkman's foes. He drugged Hall to beat Hawkgirl, to make her betray him just as (Parker believed) the Thanagarians and Earth-men had betrayed his father. Hall beat his foe and sent Parker, along with a recording of his confessions, to Thanagar to be judged for his crimes.

Arriving on Thanagar in the wake of the Rann-Thanagar War, he earned a pardon for his crimes and was instated as a Wingman leader dispatched on Rann. Half-blinded by the severe beating he suffered at Hall's hands, Parker was now equipped with a cybernetic eyepatch over the left eyesocket and a new suit of armor. In battle with Hawkman, Hawkgirl and Adam Strange, Parker was finally reunited with his father, Fel Andar, who had now forsaken his evil plans of domination and sought only forgiveness and to do what is right for Thanagar. He pleaded with his son to follow the same path. Parker foregoes a further attack on Hawkman and Hawkgirl, but it is unknown yet what path he will take. His father Fel Andar was killed during an encounter with Blackfire.

After the alien Forerunner Viza Aziv was dismissed from The Monarch's multiversal army, she found herself in space aboard a space pirate ship she promptly took as her own. Shortly afterwards, a Thanagarian fleet in search of the ship's original captain demanded her surrender, to which she challenged them and their leader to honorable combat. Their leader was Golden Eagle. Viza invoked the law of choice, a custom on her home world enabling the victor of a battle to take any prize they wanted. After she defeated him and his troops, she decided to take him as her prize, forcing him to serve as her sex slave aboard her pirate ship. When Forerunner finds a planet to call her own, she allows Golden Eagle to leave.

Aryan Brigade version
There is a second Golden Eagle that is a member of the Aryan Brigade. This Golden Eagle is much different from Golden Eagle I since he is equipped with mechanical wings and is a white supremacist like the other members of the Aryan Brigade.

Golden Eagle in other media
Golden Eagle first appeared in issue #50 of the Teen Titans Go! comics as a potential new member along with Mirage, Aquagirl, Flamebird, and Azrael.

Golden Glider

James Gordon

James Gordon Jr.

Gorilla Boss
Gorilla Boss is a fictional character appearing in American comic books published by DC Comics.

George Dyke is a crime boss who was executed in a gas chamber. His body is taken to a doctor named Doc Willard who transplants his brain into the body of a towering gorilla. When the body gains consciousness, George becomes Gorilla Boss. Due to the fact that the gorilla body doesn't speak, he uses a pad and pencil to order Doc Willard and his henchmen to procure the required funds so that he can have his brain placed in the body of Batman and Batman's brain placed in the body of the gorilla. Gorilla Boss committed a series of crimes and claims that once Batman's brain is in the body of the gorilla, the police will mistake him for the culprit and kill him. Batman escapes Gorilla Boss's grasp and is chased up the building until Gorilla Boss falls to the street where he remains unconscious by the time Batman makes it to the ground. The truth about the gorilla having George Dyke's brain and the experiments that allowed this to happen were revealed.

An alien race later places the brain of Gorilla Boss into the body of a chlorophyll-sapping alien beast as part of their plans to take over Earth. Superman and Batman were able to thwart the alien invasion, but Gorilla Boss escapes with Doc Willard. A witness to Whisperer's crime spree was later subjected to a brain surgery by Doc Willard to place Gorilla Boss' brain in him. When Batman was using a machine to get the information on Whisperer out of the witness, it was starting to reveal Batman's true identity causing Superman to destroy it. They both figured out that Doc Willard was responsible for the brain switch. Batman later finds Willard in a mentally-deranged state. When interrogating him at the Batcave, he revealed that a "yellow alien" took Gorilla Boss' brain. Batman deduces that Sinestro was responsible. Superman finds that Sinestro is using Gorilla Boss' brain to increase his power supply. Superman thwarts this plot. While Sinestro was sent back to Qward, Doc Willard is remanded to Arkham Asylum while Gorilla Boss' brain is placed back in its place in the Batcave.

By the time Gorilla Boss' brain is back in his gorilla body, he gets used as a pawn by Gorilla Grodd who mind-controls him, Congorilla, B'wana Beast's gorilla companion Djuba, Monsieur Mallah, and Sam Simeon. Though it also affects Swamp Thing. When Gorilla Grodd's psychic abilities have reached his limit enough to damage his brain, Gorilla Boss and the other apes are freed from his mind-control.

Gorilla Boss in other media
Gorilla Boss appears in the Batman: The Brave and the Bold episode "Gorillas in our Midst!", voiced by Diedrich Bader. This version sports a suit and can speak. He joins forces with Gorilla Grodd and Monsieur Mallah to form G.A.S.P. (Gorillas and Apes Seizing Power) and replace Gotham City's population with gorillas. However, they are defeated by Batman, Detective Chimp, B'wana Beast, and Vixen.

Gorilla Grodd

Gravedigger
Gravedigger is the name of two different characters appearing in American comic books published by DC Comics.

Ulysses Hazard

Ulysses Hazard is a soldier who operated during World War II.

Ulysses was revealed to have a grandson named Perseus "Percy" Hazard who operated as Hazard of Squad K.

Tyson Sykes

Tyson Sykes is a Checkmate agent and one of their Rooks. He would later become part of a project that involved getting injected with a formula that also contained Starro DNA.

Gravedigger in other media
The Tyson Sykes incarnation of Gravedigger appears in season three of Black Lightning, portrayed by Wayne Brady. This version fought in World War II, gained his powers through a government experiment, was given a formula created by Dr. Helga Jace that maintained his youth, and is Black Lightning's great-uncle. After becoming disillusioned by racism during WWII, Sykes defected to Markovia following the war to help them establish a metahuman nation. In the present, he takes part in Markovia's invasion of Freeland, where he battles Black Lightning several times until Sykes is presumed dead in the explosion of an A.S.A. facility called the Pit. Having survived, a disguised Sykes observes a congressional hearing where Black Lightning exposes the A.S.A. and Markovia's metahuman experiments before leaving, satisfied by the outcome.

Green Arrow

Green Lantern

Grid
Grid is a fictional character appearing in American comic books published by DC Comics.

After Dr. Silas Stone used his technology to convert his son into Cyborg, some technology manifested that wanted Cyborg to get information on metahumans. When he fought the controls, the secondary cybernetic systems began to hunt passively for information. Cyborg began to refer to the software as the "Grid". As it grew with every computer intelligence, it developed quirks and traits from the hackers and viruses that it encountered. Its full sentience was brought out by Atomica where she used it to steal the date of the Justice League's adventures during the events of the "Trinity War" storyline. When she betrayed the Justice League upon revealing her allegiance to the arrival of the Crime Syndicate of America, Atomica brought Grid into the group. When it joined the Crime Syndicate, it got what it wanted: a body made from Cyborg's robot prosthesis and emotions.

During the "Forever Evil" storyline, Grid served the Crime Syndicate as their datahub in their plan to take over the world. He starts by cutting power to all major cities, and orchestrates the release of all prisoners from the world's superhuman prisons. Grid continues to examine case files for the Crime Syndicate members attempting to learn how to feel, and sees Power Ring, Johnny Quick, Atomica, and Deathstorm's histories of how they gained their powers. However, he is unable to view Superwoman's history as her file has been deleted to which he states that if he had feelings, it would now be suspicion. With he had the Metal Men reactivated, Cyborg informs them of Grid as they head to Happy Harbor to take on the Crime Syndicate. Cyborg lures Grid out and the Metal Men begin attacking him. Grid brings Society members to help as Grid enters Cyborg's new body. Cyborg is able to trap Grid in his body as the Metal Men defeat the Secret Society of Super Villains members that are present.

During the "Darkseid War" storyline, Grid is still in Cyborg's body at the time when the surviving Crime Syndicate members and the Justice League in a plot to end the conflict between Darkseid and the Anti-Monitor. Grid is able to make Cyborg become it. When the fight was over, Grid and Owlman were the remaining Crime Syndicate members where Owlman has Grid downloaded into Metron's Mobius Chair. The two of them are seemingly destroyed by a powerful entity.

Grid in other media
 A variation of Grid appears in Doom Patrol, voiced by an uncredited actor. Similarly to the comics, this version is Cyborg's computer AI. While Cyborg is working with the Doom Patrol, Mr. Nobody manipulates him into believing Grid has gone rogue by making Grid take control of his cybernetics against his will and attack his father Silas Stone.
 Grid appears as a "Premier Skin" for Cyborg in Injustice 2, voiced by Khary Payton. This version is an android clone of Cyborg that was created by Brainiac.
 Grid appears in Lego DC Super-Villains, voiced by Bumper Robinson. This version possesses emotions and is Cyborg's Earth-3 counterpart. After the Justice League go missing, Grid and the Crime Syndicate pose as the Justice Syndicate to take advantage of the situation. While fighting the Legion of Doom, Grid is destroyed and defeated by Deadshot, Captain Boomerang, the Rookie, Harley Quinn, Catwoman, and Solomon Grundy.

Gridlock

Gridlock is an alias used by two fictional supervillains appearing in American comic books published by DC Comics.

Abner Girdler
Abner Girdler was a specialist in urban planning and new transportation technologies at Technodyne. He proposed to build a monorail in Manchester, Alabama, but the project was scrapped at the last minute by the county transportation commissioner, Clifton Burdett. Having lost the lucrative contract, Technodyne faced bankruptcy, and CEO Leo Nordstrom fired Girdler. Burdett later ran for mayor, and Girdler decided to sabotage his election by donning the guise of Gridlock, equipped with technology able to steal the kinetic energy from people and objects, leaving them in stasis for about an hour. Gridlock kidnapped Nordstrom and froze most of Manchester, but was eventually defeated by Impulse.

Gridlock II
He first appears in Bat-Mite #2 (September 2015) and was created by Dan Jurgens and Corin Howell. He is a villain who is stuck in the past and out to stop the future from coming. He also despises youth and youth culture in general.

Gridlock in other media
Gridlock appears in The Flash episode "Nora", portrayed by Daniel Cudmore. This version is William Lang, a kinetic energy-absorbing metahuman. After attacking an airplane, he is defeated by the Flash, Kid Flash, and XS. However, the Central City Police Department convoy transporting him to prison is intercepted by Cicada, who uses a meta-tech dagger to kill him.

Griffin

Guardian

References

 DC Comics characters: G, List of